William Charles may refer to:

William Charles (cartoonist) (1776–1820), Scottish-born engraver who immigrated to the United States
William B. Charles (1861–1950), U.S. Representative from New York
William Charles (fur trader) (1831–1903), Scottish-born fur trader who immigrated to Canada
William Charles (wrestler) (born 1993), British professional wrestler
William Charles (judge) (born 1948), judge of the High Court of England and Wales

See also